Samir Sarsare is a Moroccan footballer. He usually plays as forward. Sarsare is currently attached to Moghreb Tétouan.

External links

1975 births
Living people
Moroccan footballers
Morocco international footballers
Moghreb Tétouan players
Hassania Agadir players
People from Youssoufia
Kawkab Marrakech players
Association football forwards